Leticia Vasquez is an American former mayor of Lynwood, California, United States. She is a registered Democrat.

Biography
Vasquez was born and raised in Lynwood, the daughter of immigrants from Mexico. She graduated with a B.A. in criminal justice and a M.A. in public policy & administration from California State University, Long Beach and with a M.A. in education from Pepperdine University.

Vasquez was elected to the Lynwood City Council in November 2003 and made history as the first Latina to serve as mayor of the city when she was appointed by the City Council in December 2005. In December 2006, she was succeeded as mayor by Louis Byrd. In September 2007, she was ousted from the City Council in a recall election which also resulted in the removal of mayor Louis Byrd and fellow council members Fernando Pedroza and Alfreddie Johnson Jr. Mayor Pro Tem Maria Teresa Santillan, the only council member to not face a recall vote, served as interim mayor. 

While mayor, Vazquez faced criticism for not more aggressively representing Latino interests in a town that was roughly 80% Latino with a declining, although influential, Black population. In 2003, she had nominated Louis Byrd for mayor over the Latino candidate.

On June 5, 2012, Vasquez was elected to the Central Basin Municipal Water District.

Vasquez is also a professor of political science at El Camino College in Compton, California.

References

External links
Official homepage

Living people
American politicians of Mexican descent
Mayors of places in California
Women mayors of places in California
People from Lynwood, California
Year of birth missing (living people)
Place of birth missing (living people)
Hispanic and Latino American mayors in California
Hispanic and Latino American women in politics
Mayors of Lynwood, California
21st-century American women